John Benjamin Hoekstra (November 7, 1917 – October 25, 2006) was an American professional basketball player. He played in the National Basketball League for the Kankakee Gallagher Trojans during the 1937–38 season and averaged 5.8 points per game.

References

External links
 
 

1917 births
2006 deaths
American men's basketball players
Basketball players from Illinois
Centers (basketball)
Kankakee Gallagher Trojans players
People from Kankakee County, Illinois